The SECR F1 class was a class of 4-4-0 steam locomotives of the South Eastern and Chatham Railway. The class was rebuilt from older Stirling F class locomotives by Harry Wainwright between 1903 and 1919.

Numbering
Seventy-six locomotives were rebuilt and 75 survived into Southern Railway (SR) ownership on 1 January 1923 with random numbers between 2 and 250. Nine locomotives  survived into British Railways (BR) ownership in 1948. Numbers of these nine were:

Accidents and incidents
On 19 August 1928 A148 was deliberately crashed into a lorry at Lasham, between Basingstoke and Alton, for the film 'the Wrecker'. The remains were cut up on site.

References

F1
4-4-0 locomotives
Railway locomotives introduced in 1903
Scrapped locomotives
Standard gauge steam locomotives of Great Britain